The 1978 Brazilian Grand Prix was a Formula One motor race held on 29 January 1978 at Jacarepagua. The race was run at the height of summer in Rio de Janeiro in 100 degree F temperatures, and it was won by Argentine driver Carlos Reutemann driving a Ferrari 312T2 in a flag-to-flag performance. The win also represented the first win for tyre manufacturer Michelin. Local driver Emerson Fittipaldi was second, scoring the first podium finish for the Fittipaldi team with Austrian Brabham driver Niki Lauda finishing third. French driver Didier Pironi took his first points in Formula One, finishing sixth, while Arrows made its F1 debut with Riccardo Patrese finishing tenth, four laps down.

Qualifying

Qualifying classification 

*Positions in red indicate entries that failed to qualify.

Race

Report 
The first Formula One race held at Jacarepagua was held in typically extreme weather conditions of January in Rio, meaning the race was held in both hot and humid conditions. Ronnie Peterson took the pole position in the leading Lotus ahead of James Hunt in the leading McLaren, teammate Mario Andretti in the other Lotus, Carlos Reutemann in the leading Ferrari, Patrick Tambay in the second McLaren and Gilles Villeneuve in the other Ferrari.

Peterson got off to a poor start from the pole and dropped back to 4th, whilst into the first corner it was Reutemann from 4th on the grid who got the best start and lead the first lap for Ferrari ahead of Hunt, Andretti, Peterson, Tambay and Villeneuve. Hunt in the leading McLaren and Andretti in the leading Lotus were running 2nd and 3rd behind Reutemann, until Hunt was forced to pit for tyres whilst Andretti soon started to suffer from gearbox problems and dropped to 4th, handing their 2nd and 3rd places over to home favourite Emerson Fittipaldi and reigning world-champion Niki Lauda respectively. Peterson eventually retired after a collision by lap 16. The hot and humid conditions had eventually caused Hunt, Tambay and Villeneuve in the other Ferrari to all spin off and crash by lap 36. Reutemann meanwhile had no challengers for the lead all race long, and won by a comfortable margin ahead of former double world-champion Fittipaldi, Lauda, Andretti in the remaining Lotus, Clay Regazzoni in the Shadow and Didier Pironi in the Tyrrell.

Classification

Championship standings after the race 

Drivers' Championship standings

Constructors' Championship standings

Note: Only the top five positions are included for both sets of standings.

References

Brazilian Grand Prix
Brazilian Grand Prix
Grand Prix
Brazilian Grand Prix